is a 2017 anime series based on Light's visual novel of the same name, animated by A.C.G.T.

Synopsis
On May 1, 1945 in Germany, a group of Nazi officers carried out a certain ritual during Berlin's collapse since the countless lives lost in the battle served as a catalyst to their sacrificial ceremony. Following the war, they faded into the realm of myth with no one knowing if this group of officers succeeded in reviving the Order of the 13 Lances. 61 years later in Japan, Ren Fujii's friendship with Shirou Yusa shatters to pieces following a certain incident, ending in a vicious fight that sends Ren into the hospital for two months. After leaving the hospital, Ren intended to rebuild his new life without Shirou, but his plan falls apart as irrationality that defies the realm of common sense begins to assault and devour the city. Abnormalities soon seek to destroy everything Ren holds dear before his eyes with overwhelming violence. Even if it means crossing the boundary between the ordinary and the extraordinary, Ren must change though his desires are hardly anything grand. All he wants is to return to the old days filled with simple, everyday joy.

Characters

A lone wolf lacking in sociality, who just leaves the hospital after two months due to a fight between him and Shirou. He receives his powers after a transfer from Kasumi, and learns to harness them with training from Kei Sakurai.

A mysterious blonde haired girl with a large scar around her neck who appears in Ren's dreams after seeing a guillotine at a sword exhibition. She forms a contract with Ren to exhibit his powers.

An unyielding and masculine girl, who looks after Ren and cares for him.

A popular upperclassman with a mixed heritage of German and Japanese blood. She normally tends to keep her distance from those around her.

Ren's childhood best friend who is a genius but bored with life. Due to being constant thrill seeker, he has a brutal fight with Ren, breaking their friendship. He then disappears from school and hasn't been heard since.

A young woman whom Shirou meets while he was hospitalized, and the daughter of the director of the hospital Shiro stayed at.

Leader of the Longinus Dreizehn Orden and a high-ranking official in Germany. He is known as a highly dangerous individual, due to his seemingly boundless talent in all fields. He then forms the Obsidian Round Table alongside Mercurius after faking his death and acted behind the scenes of World War II and kept on destroying friend and foe alike. Reinhard disappears after the fall of Berlin with current whereabouts a mystery.

An albino with a long criminal record, Wilhelm served as First Lieutenant for the infamous 36th Waffen Grenadier Division of the SS. His senses magnify in the darkness, almost as if he was a vampire and embraces it as part of his identity. Even Wilhelm's designation and fondness for vampiric characteristics is no coincidence.

Descendant of a bloodline that allied with the Obsidian Round Table during World War II. She joined the Table to fill the spot left by Beatrice Kirchisen, who had passed away eleven years prior.

The former seat of which is now presided by her descendant, Kei Sakurai. She was the lover of Kei's older brother Kai, who is the current Sakurai to inhibit the spirit of Tubal Cain.

One of the twins born from Lisa Brenner, alongside his brother Johann, and the grandfather from Rea Himuro.

An early member of the Deutsches Ahnenerbe, Nazi Germany's institute of archaeological and occult research, and a genuine witch who had stepped into the realm of sorcery even before joining the LDO. Her youthful appearance shelters one of the most ancient souls to have sworn loyalty to the Obsidian Round Table. Despite being cunning and crafty at her core, she is playful and flirtatious on the outside, making her a very dangerous individual to associate with. She also has a fondness for torture and is known to be extremely moody. Though essentially not a fighter, her cruelty rivals even Wilhelm's.

A spider-like man who generates razor-sharp strands of webbing that can cut through human bodies with ease. Despite his status as the Tenth member of the obsidian round table, he is one of the weaker minions of Reinhard.

An ominous magician and alchemist who created Ewigkeit and established the Obsidian Round Table. He was the one responsible for turning the LDO from a clique of elite army officers merely dabbling in the occult into a den of genuine demons. Not only is Mercurius the one sworn friend of the Table's leader, he also stands as the only being capable of matching his sublime prowess. Although his position could be considered that of a mentor and a father, the other LDO members - with the exception of their master - shun him as a hateful taboo. His whereabouts have remained a mystery for the past six decades.

Anime
The anime was unveiled in December 2015, and aired on television in Japan from October 7 to December 29, 2017. It is produced by the studio Genco, with script supervision by the game's designer, Takashi Masada. The series ran for 12 episodes and the remaining 6 episodes aired on July 1, 2018. The opening theme is "Kadenz" by Yui Sakakibara, while Junichi Suwabe and Kōsuke Toriumi of the voice actor unit Phero Men perform the ending theme. Crunchyroll streamed the series worldwide outside of Asia, and Funimation released a dub for it. On March 14, 2018, it was announced that Dies Irae will return with a second cour and premiered on July 1. Crunchyroll streamed the last 6 episodes.

Production
The Dies Irae anime project was financed through a crowdfunding campaign ending in July 2015, through which ¥96,560,858 was raised, over three times the target figure of ¥30,000,000.

Notes

References

External links
  
 

2017 anime television series debuts
Anime television series based on video games
Crowdfunding projects
Crunchyroll anime
Funimation
Genco
Television series about Nazis